The Lucken Farm near Portland, North Dakota is a bonanza farm that was developed by 1888. The owner of the farm was Halleck E. Lucken, the son of Norwegian immigrants. The farm was listed on the National Register of Historic Places in 1986.  The listing included seven contributing buildings on.

References

Farms on the National Register of Historic Places in North Dakota
1888 establishments in Dakota Territory
Norwegian-American culture in North Dakota
Historic districts on the National Register of Historic Places in North Dakota
National Register of Historic Places in Traill County, North Dakota
Bonanza farms